The Bathinda–Rewari line is a railway line connecting  in the Indian state of the Punjab and Rewari in Haryana. There are links to Sadulpur and Rohtak also. The line is under the administrative jurisdiction of Northern Railway and North Western Railway.

History
The Rajputana–Malwa Railway extended the -wide metre gauge Delhi–Rewari line to Bathinda in 1884. The metre-gauge Hisar–Sadulpur link was laid in 1911. The Bhiwani–Rohtak link was laid in 1979. and the Hisar–Jakkhal link was also laid on 1 November 1913.

Gauge conversion and electrification
The Bathinda–Rewari metre-gauge line was converted to -wide broad gauge in 1994. The metre-gauge Hisar–Sadulpur link was converted to broad gauge in 2009. Bhiwani–Rohtak link was also converted to broad gauge. and the another link between Hisar–Jakkhal was also converted to broad gauge.

Loco shed
The locomotive shed at Rewari has been restored. It now houses broad gauge locomotives.

References

External links
Trains at Bathinda
Trains at Rewari

5 ft 6 in gauge railways in India
Rail transport in Rajasthan
Rail transport in Haryana
Rail transport in Punjab, India

Transport in Bathinda
Rewari district